Děpoltovice is a municipality and village in Karlovy Vary District in the Karlovy Vary Region of the Czech Republic. It has about 400 inhabitants.

Administrative parts
The village of Nivy is an administrative part of Děpoltovice.

References

Villages in Karlovy Vary District